Peter Percy Fowler Pike (3 November 1879 – 3 September 1949) was an Australian politician.

He was born in Launceston. In 1943 he was elected to the Tasmanian House of Assembly as a Labor member for Wilmot. He was elected Speaker in 1948, serving until his death in Launceston in 1949.

References

1879 births
1949 deaths
Members of the Tasmanian House of Assembly
Speakers of the Tasmanian House of Assembly
Australian Labor Party members of the Parliament of Tasmania